Joaquín Emanuel Muñoz Esparza (born 17 August 1992) is a Chilean footballer that currently plays for Audax Italiano in the Primera División de Chile.

External links
 

1992 births
Living people
Tercera División de Chile players
Chilean Primera División players
Municipal La Pintana footballers
Audax Italiano footballers
Association football goalkeepers
Chilean footballers